Patrick, Pat, or Paddy Hogan may refer to:

 Patrick Hogan (Australian politician) (1835–1918), New South Wales politician
 Patrick Hogan (biologist), American scientist
 Patrick Hogan (Ceann Comhairle) (1885–1969), Irish Labour party politician, represented Clare
 Patrick Hogan (Cumann na nGaedheal politician) (1891–1936), Irish Cumann na nGaedhael/Fine Gael politician, represented Galway
 Patrick Hogan (Farmers' Party politician) (fl. 1920s), Irish Farmers Party politician, represented Limerick in the 1920s
 Patrick Hogan (racehorse breeder) (1939–2023), New Zealand horse breeder and horse racer
 Patrick Hogan (soccer) (born 1997), American soccer player
 Patrick Hogan (Tipperary politician) (1907–1972), Irish Fine Gael politician, represented Tipperary South
 Patrick J. Hogan (Maryland politician) (born 1962), former member of the Maryland Senate
 Patrick N. Hogan (born 1979), former member of the Maryland House of Delegates
 Pat Hogan (1920–1966), American actor
 Pat Hogan (footballer) (1930–2017), Australian rules footballer
 Paddy Hogan, Kilkenny hurler